Camptoloma interiorata is a moth of the subfamily Arctiinae. It is found in China, Japan, the Korean Peninsula and the Russian Far East.

The wingspan is 30–33 mm.

It is considered a pest on Quercus species and Sapium sebiferum.

External links
 , 2005: Two new species of the genus Camptoloma (Lepidoptera: Noctuidae) from China. Florida Entomologist 88 (1): 34-37. Full article: 

Arctiinae
Moths of Japan